Jason Kavanagh (born 23 November 1971) is an English former football defender.

Career
He began his playing career in 1988, signing for Derby County on leaving school in the summer of 1988 and turning professional soon afterwards and playing for them during their relegation from the Football League First Division in 1991 and still being there when they returned to the top flight (now the FA Premier League) with promotion in 1996. However, he lost his place at right-back to Jacob Laursen around this time, and in the autumn of 1996 he was sold to Wycombe Wanderers for £25,000 after a loan spell. He had played 96 league games for the Rams, scoring once.

At Adams Park, he helped keep Wycombe in Division Two and remained with them for three seasons, playing 89 league games and scoring once.

A brief spell at Stoke City followed in 1999 where he made just nine appearances, before he signed for newly promoted Division Two side Cambridge United and made 19 appearances as they achieved survival at this level in the 1999-2000 season. However, this was the end of his career as a professional player when still only aged 28, as he transferred to Northern Premier League side Burton Albion that summer. He would remain at the Brewers for three seasons, helping them win the Northern Premier title in 2002, before finally retiring in 2003 after 89 games and seven goals for them.

Career statistics
Source:

A.  The "Other" column constitutes appearances and goals in the Full Members Cup, Football League play-offs, and Football League Trophy.

References

External links
 

Living people
English footballers
Burton Albion F.C. players
Cambridge United F.C. players
Derby County F.C. players
Stoke City F.C. players
Wycombe Wanderers F.C. players
English Football League players
1971 births
Association football defenders